"Sky" is a song by New Zealand boy band Titanium, from their debut studio album All For You (2012). It is the album's third single and was released by Illegal Musik on Friday, 2 November 2012. "Sky" premiered on radio station, The Edge on Thursday, 1 November. The song was made available for pre order via iTunes. "Sky" is an uptempo pop dance song written by Vince Harder.

"Sky" has received positive reviews from music critics, commending its chorus, catchy melody and rap verse.

Chart performance
On the official New Zealand Singles Chart it debuted at number 12 on Monday, 12 November 2012.

Music video 
The music video for "Sky" was directed by Shae Sterling. 
The music video premiered both on YouTube and music request show, Four Live at 5.25pm November 20, 2012. The video features the band performing on a spaceship on a journey through space, while dancing with their lovers. The video was shot using the Panasonic Lumix DMC-GH3 camera.

Live performances
Titanium performed "Sky" for the first time on Good Morning on Monday, 3 December 2012.

Track listing
Digital download
"Sky" – 3:43

CD single
"Sky" – 3:43

Charts and certifications

Release history

References

External links
Win

2012 singles
Songs written by Vince Harder
Titanium (band) songs
2012 songs
Illegal Musik singles
Songs written by Inoke Finau